An Extraordinary Cab Accident is a 1903 British short  silent comedy film, directed by Walter R. Booth, featuring a gentleman making a miraculous recovery after being trampled underfoot by a horse and cab. The film, "seems something of a step back," "compared with the elaborate special effects fantasies that director W.R. Booth and producer R.W. Paul had already concocted," but according to Michael Brooke of BFI Screenonline, "more complex special effects might well have worked against the impression Booth and Paul were clearly seeking to create, which is that of a man being genuinely run over by a horse-drawn cab, his body being knocked down and trampled by the horse's hooves."

References

External links

 

1903 films
British black-and-white films
British silent short films
1903 comedy films
1903 short films
British comedy short films
Films directed by Walter R. Booth
Silent comedy films